Mesodiphlebia crassivenia is a species of snout moth. It was described by Zeller in 1881, and is known from Panama.

References

Moths described in 1881
Anerastiini